Peter Mutkovič (born 19 October 1945) is a Slovak former footballer. He competed in the men's tournament at the 1968 Summer Olympics. On a club level he played for ŠK Slovan Bratislava. He won two caps for the Czechoslovakia national football team.

References

External links
 

1945 births
Living people
Slovak footballers
Czechoslovak footballers
Czechoslovakia international footballers
Olympic footballers of Czechoslovakia
Footballers at the 1968 Summer Olympics
Footballers from Bratislava
Association football defenders
ŠK Slovan Bratislava players